A knife (: knives) is a sharpened hand tool.

Knife or knives may also refer to:

Tools/weapons 
 Blade
 dao, single-bladed Chinese swords
 Knife (envelope)

Music 
 The Knife, a Swedish electronic music duo
 Knife (album), by Aztec Camera
 The Knife (Goldfinger album)
 The Knife (The Knife album)
 "Knife" (Grizzly Bear song)
 "The Knife" (song), by Genesis
 "Knife", a song by Rockwell from Somebody's Watching Me
 "Knives", a song by 10 Years from Minus the Machine
 "Knives", a song by Kim Petras from Turn Off the Light
 "Knives", a song by Shrubbies from Memphis in Texas

Film and television 
 The Knife (1961 film), a 1961 Dutch film
 , a 1967 Yugoslav film
 The Knife (1999 film), a 1999 Yugoslav film
 "Knives" (Babylon 5), TV series episode
 Knife, TV series character from The Annoying Orange

Books 
 The Knife, a 1961 novel by Hal Ellson
 Knife, a 2009 novel by R. J. Anderson and the first novel in the Faery Rebels series
 Knife (novel), a 2019 novel by Jo Nesbø

Other uses 
 Duncan McCoshan, cartoonist in the Knife and Packer team
 "The Knife", nickname of Martin de Knijff, Swedish gambler
 The Knife, nickname for Yellowknife, Northwest Territories, Canada

See also
Knife River (disambiguation)
Mack the Knife (disambiguation)